Cranberry Point Battery was a First World War era coastal defence battery which defended the approaches to Sydney Harbour.

It originally consisted of two 4.7 inch quick firing guns which were later removed and replaced with a concrete observation tower and two concrete searchlight emplacements.

Notes and references

Military forts in Nova Scotia
Coastal artillery
Artillery batteries